The Bugey Nuclear Power Plant  is located in Bugey in the Saint-Vulbas commune (Ain), about 75 km from the Swiss border.  The site occupies 100 hectares.  It is on the edge of the Rhône River, from where it gets its cooling water, and is about 35 km upstream from Lyon and 72 km from Grenoble.  About 1,200 people work at the site.

The site houses 4 currently operating units, all being pressurized water reactors. The 5th reactor (unit 1) is currently being dismantled. It was the last UNGG reactor built in the world.

Some of the cooling comes from direct use of the Rhône water (units 2 and 3) while some is done by the use of cooling towers (units 4 and 5).

Seismic activity
The area is not known for its seismic activity.

In the last few years, the plant was modernized to updated earthquake resistance standards.

Heat dumping
During the heat wave on 20 July 2003, waste heat water was piped into the Rhône, which is permitted, in extreme cases, for about 2 hours and the maximum heat difference was 0.9 degrees Celsius. Again on 30 July 2003, water was directly discharged into the Rhône for 9 hours.

Reactor units

Bugey 5 was offline from August 2015 to July 2017 due to an air leak in the inner liner of its containment.

References

External links

INSC database: Bugey 

Nuclear power stations in France
Buildings and structures in Ain